Lepidozona is a genus of chitons belonging to the family Ischnochitonidae.

The species of this genus are found on the coasts of Pacific Ocean.

Species
The following species are recognised in the genus Lepidozona:

Lepidozona acostata 
Lepidozona allynsmithi 
Lepidozona amabilis 
Lepidozona bisculpta 
Lepidozona christiaensi 
Lepidozona clarionensis 
Lepidozona clathrata 
Lepidozona cooperi 
Lepidozona coreanica 
Lepidozona craticulata 
Lepidozona crockeri 
Lepidozona excellens 
Lepidozona ferreirai 
Lepidozona formosa 
Lepidozona guadalupensis 
Lepidozona hyotanseana 
Lepidozona interfossa 
Lepidozona interstincta 
Lepidozona iyoensis 
Lepidozona laurae 
Lepidozona luzanovkensis 
Lepidozona luzonica 
Lepidozona mertensii 
Lepidozona multigranosa 
Lepidozona nipponica 
Lepidozona pectinulata 
Lepidozona radians 
Lepidozona reevei 
Lepidozona retiporosa 
Lepidozona rothi 
Lepidozona scabricostata 
Lepidozona scrobiculata 
Lepidozona serrata 
Lepidozona sirenkoi 
Lepidozona skoglundi 
Lepidozona sorsogonensis 
Lepidozona stohleri 
Lepidozona subtilis 
Lepidozona tenuicostata 
Lepidozona vietnamensis 
Lepidozona willetti

References

Ischnochitonidae
Chiton genera